Elachista chilotera is a moth of the family Elachistidae. It is found in Australia in south-western Western Australia.

Adults are ash grey.

The larvae feed on Lepidosperma tuberculatum. They mine the leaves of their host plant. The mine has the form of a swollen chamber in the center of the leaf. Pupation takes place outside of the mine on a leaf of the host plant.

References

Moths described in 2011
chilotera
Moths of Australia
Taxa named by Lauri Kaila